Erich Buljung (born March 21, 1944) is a Yugoslav American former sport shooter who competed in the 1984 Summer Olympics and 1988 Summer Olympics.

Records

References

1944 births
Living people
American male sport shooters
United States Distinguished Marksman
ISSF pistol shooters
Shooters at the 1984 Summer Olympics
Shooters at the 1988 Summer Olympics
Olympic silver medalists for the United States in shooting
Medalists at the 1988 Summer Olympics
Pan American Games medalists in shooting
Pan American Games gold medalists for the United States
Shooters at the 1983 Pan American Games
Shooters at the 1987 Pan American Games
Medalists at the 1983 Pan American Games
Medalists at the 1987 Pan American Games